Ernests Gulbis and Rainer Schüttler were the defending champions, but chose not to participate that year.

Seeds

Draw

Finals

External links
Draw

Doubles